The 2002 Paris–Tours was the 96th edition of the Paris–Tours cycle race and was held on 6 October 2002. The race started in Saint-Arnoult-en-Yvelines and finished in Tours. The race was won by Jakob Piil of the CSC–Tiscali team.

General classification

References

2002 in French sport
2002
Paris-Tours
2002 in road cycling
October 2002 sports events in France